Bendiks Harald Arnesen (born 9 June 1951 in Kvæfjord) is a Norwegian politician for the Labour Party.

He was elected to the Norwegian Parliament from Troms in 1997, and has been re-elected on two occasions. He had previously served as a deputy representative during the terms 1989–1993 and 1993–1997.

On the local level he was a member of Kvæfjord from 1971 to 1975 and 1979 to 1995, serving as deputy mayor in 1983–1985 and mayor from 1986 to 1995. He chaired the municipal party chapter from 1980 to 1986 and the county chapter from 1990 to 1992. He was a member of the Labour Party national board from 1991 to 1992.

He does not have higher education, but mainly worked on a boat before entering national politics.

References

1951 births
Living people
People from Kvæfjord
Members of the Storting
Mayors of places in Troms
Labour Party (Norway) politicians
21st-century Norwegian politicians
20th-century Norwegian politicians